Romania participated at the 2018 Summer Youth Olympics in Buenos Aires, Argentina from 6 October to 18 October 2018.

Athletics

Basketball

Romania qualified a girls' team based on the U18 3x3 National Federation Ranking.

 Girls' tournament - 1 team of 4 athletes

Shoot-out contest

Diving

Fencing

Romania qualified two athletes based on its performance at the 2018 Cadet World Championship.

 Boys' Sabre - Andrei Pastin
 Girls' Foil - Rebeca Candescu

Gymnastics

Artistic
Romania qualified one gymnast based on its performance at the 2018 European Junior Championship.

 Girls' artistic individual all-around - 1 quota

Rhythmic
Romania qualified one rhythmic gymnast based on its performance at the European qualification event.

 Girls' rhythmic individual all-around - 1 quota

Judo

Individual

Team

Rowing

Romania qualified two boats based on its performance at the 2017 World Junior Rowing Championships.

 Boys' pair – 2 athletes
 Girls' pair – 2 athletes

Shooting

Individual

Team

Swimming

Table tennis

Romania qualified two table tennis players based on its performance at the Road to Buenos Aires (Europe) series.

 Boys' singles - Cristian Pletea
 Girls' singles - Andreea Dragoman

Tennis

Singles

Doubles

Weightlifting

Romania qualified two athletes based on its performance at the 2017 World Youth Championships.

Boys

Girls

Wrestling

Key:
  – Victory by Fall
  – Without any points scored by the opponent
  – With point(s) scored by the opponent
  – Without any points scored by the opponent
  – With point(s) scored by the opponent

References

2018 in Romanian sport
Nations at the 2018 Summer Youth Olympics
Romania at the Youth Olympics